Dual Committee is an album by 3X Krazy members Keak da Sneak and Agerman under the name Dual Committee. It was released March 21, 2000 on Moe Doe Records and was produced by Ant Banks, E-A-Ski & CMT, Rick Rock,  Alonzo Jackson, Mike Sexton and Tone Capone. 3X Krazy member B.A. did not participate in the recording.

Track listing 
"Intro" - 2:03
"Your Friends" - 4:04
"Can't Stop It" - 3:58
"Dedicated" - 3:51
"Believe It" - 4:01
"Skit" - 0:10
"R. S." (Hi-Tech Version) - 4:13
"Hit the Gas Again" - 4:26
"Bring the Pain" - 4:35
"Outro" - 1:02

3X Krazy albums
2000 albums
Albums produced by Ant Banks